Dring's rock gecko (Cnemaspis dringi), also known commonly as Dring's Borneo rock gecko, is a species of lizard in the family Gekkonidae. The species is endemic to Borneo.

Etymology
The specific name, dringi, is in honor of British herpetologist Julian Christopher Mark Dring (born 1951).

Habitat

Description
It has dark flanks with whitish spots.

Reproduction
C. dringi is oviparous.

References

Further reading
Das I (2004). Lizards of Borneo: A Pocket Guide. Kota Kinabalu, Borneo: Natural History Publications. 89 pp. . 
Das I, Bauer AM (1998). "Systematics and biogeography of Bornean geckos of the genus Cnemaspis Strauch, 1887 (Sauria: Geckonidae), with the description of a new species". Raffles Bulletin of Zoology 46 (1): 11–28. (Cnemaspis dringi, new species).
Grismer LL, Wood PL Jr, Anuar S, Riyanto A, Ahmad N, Muin MA, Sumontha M, Grismer JL, Chan KO, Quah ESH, Pauwels OSG (2014). "Systematics and natural history of Southeast Asian Rock Geckos (genus Cnemaspis Strauch, 1887) with descriptions of eight new species from Malaysia, Thailand, and Indonesia". Zootaxa 3880 (1): 001–147. (Cnemaspis dringi, p. 131).
Rösler H (2000). "Kommentierte Liste der rezent, subrezent und fossil bekannten Geckotaxa (Reptilia: Gekkonomorpha)". Gekkota 2: 28–153. (Cnemaspis dringi, p. 62). (in German).

Cnemaspis
Reptiles described in 1998